Arkadii Ivanovich Elistratov (1872-?) was professor of police law at Moscow University. In the 1910s he drafted laws to end the regulation of prostitution and to outlaw it instead.

Selected publications
 O prikreplenii zhenshchiny k prostitutsii. Kazan, 1903.
 "Bednost' i prostitutsiia" in Soiuz zhenshchin, Nos. 3–4. (October–November 1907): 5–7; 4–7.
 "Meditsinskaia statistika zashchitnikov politsii nravov" in Trudy s"ezda po bor'be s torgom zhenshchinami i ego prichinami proiskhodivshchago v S.-Peterburge s 21 do 25 aprelia 1910 goda, Vol. 2., St. Petersburg, 1911–12.
 "Rol' prava i nravstvennosti v bor'be s torgom i kupleiu zhenshchin v tseliakh razvrata" in Trudy s"ezda po bor'be s torgom zhenshchinami i ego prichinami proiskhodivshchago v S.-Peterburge s 21 do 25 aprelia 1910 goda, Vol. 2, St. Petersburg, 1911–12.
 Ocherk administrativnogo prava. 1922.
 "Prostitutsiia v Rossii do revoliutsii 1917 g" in Prostitutsiia v Rossii. Moscow, 1927.(Joint editor with Volf M. Bronner)

References

Further reading
 Bernstein, Laurie. (1995) Sonia's Daughters: Prostitutes and Their Regulation in Imperial Russia. University of California Press. 

Year of death missing
Academics from the Russian Empire
1872 births
Academic staff of Moscow State University
Legal scholars from the Russian Empire
Date of birth missing
Place of birth missing
Place of death missing
Scholars of administrative law